The 2016–17 Cincinnati Bearcats men's basketball team represented the University of Cincinnati in the 2016–17 NCAA Division I men's basketball season. The team played its home games at Fifth Third Arena, with a capacity of 13,176. The season marked the final year prior to major renovations to Fifth Third Arena. The Bearcats were led by 11th-year head coach Mick Cronin and were members of the American Athletic Conference. They finished the season 30–6, 16–2 to finish in second place in AAC play. They beat Tulsa and UConn in the AAC tournament before losing to SMU in the championship game. They received an at-large bid to the NCAA tournament as the No. 6 seed in the South region. They defeated No. 11-seeded Kansas State in the First Round before losing to No. 3-seeded UCLA in the Second Round.

Previous season
The Bearcats finished the 2015–16 season with a record of 22–11, 12–6 in AAC play to finish in a tie for third place in conference. They lost to UConn in four overtimes in the quarterfinals of the AAC tournament. The Bearcats received an at-large bid as a No. 9 seed to the NCAA tournament where they lost to Saint Joseph's in the First Round.

Preseason
At AAC Media Day, Cincinnati was picked to win the AAC regular season title and senior guard Troy Caupain was voted as AAC Preseason Co-Player of the Year. In addition, Gary Clark and Caupain were named to the Preseason All-AAC First Team.

Offseason

Departing players

Incoming Transfers

Recruiting class of 2016

Recruiting class of 2017

Roster

Depth chart

Source

Schedule and results

|-
!colspan=6 style=| Exhibition

|-
!colspan=6 style=| Regular Season
|-

  

|-
!colspan=12 style=|AAC Tournament

|-
!colspan=12 style=| NCAA tournament

Awards and milestones

American Athletic Conference honors

All-AAC Awards
Sixth Man Award: Jarron Cumberland
Sportsmanship Award: Troy Caupain

All-AAC Second Team
Troy Caupain
Kyle Washington

All-Rookie Team
Jarron Cumberland

Player of the Week
Week 4: Kyle Washington
Week 7: Gary Clark
Week 12: Jarron Cumberland

Rookie of the Week
Week 6: Jarron Cumberland
Week 8: Jarron Cumberland
Week 17: Jarron Cumberland

Rankings

*AP does not release post-NCAA Tournament rankings

References

Cincinnati Bearcats men's basketball seasons
Cincinnati
Cincinnati
Cincinnati Bearcats
Cincinnati Bearcats